Gareth Powell Williams (6 November 1954 – 12 May 2018) was a Wales international rugby union player who played club rugby for Bridgend RFC. In 1980, he toured South Africa with the British Lions as a replacement for the injured Stuart Lane.

He had suffered with multiple system atrophy since 2012 and had been bed-bound since 2017. He died in May 2018.

He was the brother of Owain Williams.

Notes

1954 births
2018 deaths
Barbarian F.C. players
Bridgend RFC players
British & Irish Lions rugby union players from Wales
Glamorgan County RFC players
People educated at Ysgol Brynteg
People from Bedlinog
Rugby union flankers
Rugby union players from Merthyr Tydfil County Borough
Wales international rugby union players
Welsh rugby union players